This is a timeline documenting events of Jazz in the year 1996.

Events

March
 29 – The 23rd Vossajazz started in Voss, Norway (March 29 – 31).

May
 22 – The 24th Nattjazz started in Bergen, Norway (May 22 – June 2).
 24 – The 25th Moers Festival started in Moers, Germany (May 24 – 27).

June
 27 – The 17th Montreal International Jazz Festival started in Canada (June 27 – July 7).
 28 – The 6th Jazz Fest Wien started in Wien, Austria (June 28 – July 13).

July
 5 – The 30th Montreux Jazz Festival started in Switzerland (July 5 – 20).
 12
 The 21st North Sea Jazz Festival started in The Hague, Netherlands (July 12 – 14).
 The 31st Pori Jazz Festival started in Finland (July 12 – 21).
 15 – The 37th Moldejazz started in Molde, Norway (July 15 – 20).
 18 – The 49th Nice Jazz Festival started in France (July 18 – 20).
 21 – The 31st San Sebastian Jazz Festival started in San Sebastian, Spain (July 22 – 27).

August
 9 – The 13th Brecon Jazz Festival started in Brecon, Wales (August 9 – 11).

September
 19 – The 39th Monterey Jazz Festival started in Monterey, California (September 19 – 21).

Album releases

Hugh Masekela: Notes of Life
Medeski Martin & Wood: Shack-man
Courtney Pine: Modern Day Jazz Stories
Joshua Redman: Freedom in the Groove
Matthew Shipp: By the Law of Music
Guillermo Gregorio: Approximately
Ivo Perelman: Seeds, Visions and Counterpoint
Michael Formanek: Nature of the Beast
David S. Ware: Wisdom of Uncertainty
Maria Schneider: Coming About
Zeena Parkins: Mouth=Maul=Betrayer
Kenny Wheeler: Siren's Song
Gerry Hemingway: Perfect World
Ivo Perelman: Sound Hierarchy
Bob Neill: Triptycal
Branford Marsalis: The Dark Keys
Henry Threadgill: Where's Your Cup?
Evan Parker: Toward the Margins
Pat Metheny Group: Quartet
John Scofield: Quiet
Fred Anderson: Birdhouse
David S. Ware: Oblations and Blessings
David S. Ware: DAO
David S. Ware: Godspelized
William Parker: Compassion Seizes Bed-Stuy
Eliane Elias: The Three Americas
Charlie Haden: Now Is the Hour

Deaths

 January
 2 – Viatcheslav Nazarov, American trombonist, pianist and vocalist (born 1952).
 5 – Gus Bivona, American reedist (born 1915).
 11 – Ike Isaacs, Burmese-English guitarist (born 1919).
 13 – Morty Corb, American upright bassist (born 1917).
 20 – Gerry Mulligan, American saxophonist, and clarinetist (born 1927).
 28 – Pauline Braddy, African-American drummer, International Sweethearts of Rhythm (born 1922).
 29 – Ray Leatherwood, American upright bassist (born 1914).

 February
 7 – Tiny Winters, English bassist and vocalist (born 1909).
 8 – Mercer Ellington, American trumpeter, composer, and arranger (born 1919).
 12 – Alan Dawson, American drummer (born 1929).

 March
 5 – Herb Hall, American clarinetist and saxophonist (born 1907).
 27 – Howard Wyeth, American drummer and pianist

 May
 1 – Billy Byers, American trombonist and arranger (born 1927).
 25 – Barney Wilen, American saxophonist and composer (born 1937).
 27 – Pud Brown, American reedist (born 1917).
 28 – Jimmy Rowles, American pianist, vocalist, and composer (born 1918).

 June
 1 – Don Grolnick, American pianist and composer (born 1947).
 6 – Norma Teagarden, American pianist (born 1911).
 10 – Frankie Sakai, Japanese comedian, actor, and musician (born 1929).
 15 – Ella Fitzgerald, American vocalist (born 1917).
 16 – Gil Cuppini, Italian drummer and bandleader (born 1924).

 July
 3 – Pim Jacobs, American trumpeter (born 1934).
 17 – Amancio D'Silva, Indian guitarist and composer (born 1936).

 August
 6 – Bobby Enriquez, Filipino pianist (born 1943).
 24 – Carlos Vidal Bolado, American conga drum musician (born 1914).
 25 – Fred Adison, French vocalist, drummer, and bandleader (born 1908).
 31 – Milt Larkin, American trumpeter and bandleader (born 1910).

 September
 20 – Paul Weston, American pianist, arranger, composer, and conductor (born 1912).

 October
 11 – Johnny Costa, American pianist (born 1922).

 November
 2 – Eva Cassidy, American vocalist and guitarist (born 1963).
 4 – Ray Linn, American trumpeter (born 1920).
 5 – Eddie Harris, American saxophonist (born 1934).
 7
 Carmell Jones, American trumpet player (born 1936).
 Kid Sheik, American trumpeter (born 1908).
 12 – Alan Littlejohn, American trumpeter, flugelhornist, and bandleader (born 1928).
 13 – Bill Doggett, American pianist and organist (born 1916).
 23 – Art Porter Jr., American saxophonist (born 1961).

 December
 19 – Bobby Cole, American singer and pianist (born 1932).
 23 – Ronnie Scott, English tenor saxophonist and jazz club owner (born 1927).
 26 – Oscar Valdambrini, Italian jazz trumpeter (born 1924).

Births

 February
 2 – Dionne Bromfield, English singer and songwriter.
 4 – Connie Han, American pianist and composer.

 September
 8 – Alexander Bone, English saxophonist, pianist, producer, and composer.

See also

 1990s in jazz
 List of years in jazz
 1996 in music

References

External links 
 History Of Jazz Timeline: 1996 at All About Jazz

Jazz
Jazz by year